Roberto Ghelli (born 28 February 1942 in Pratovecchio) is a retired Italian professional football player.

See also
Football in Italy
List of football clubs in Italy

References

1942 births
Living people
Italian footballers
Serie A players
Inter Milan players
Ascoli Calcio 1898 F.C. players
A.C. Prato players
Rimini F.C. 1912 players
Association football forwards